The electrical power industry in the United Kingdom was nationalised by the Electricity Act 1947, when over six hundred electric power companies were merged into twelve area boards.

List of companies

Companies merged into East Midlands Electricity Board (EMEB)

The board's area was defined as: Leicestershire, Northamptonshire, Rutland and parts of Bedfordshire, Buckinghamshire, Derbyshire, Lincolnshire, Nottinghamshire, Staffordshire and Warwickshire.

Local authority undertakings
Ashbourne Urban District Council
Bolsover Urban District Council
Burton upon Trent Borough Corporation
Chesterfield Borough Corporation
Coventry County Borough Corporation
Derby County Borough Corporation
East Retford Borough Corporation
Kettering Borough Corporation
Leicester County Borough Corporation
Lincoln County Borough Corporation
Long Eaton Urban District Council
Loughborough Borough Corporation
Mansfield Borough Corporation
Newark Borough Corporation
Nottingham County Borough Corporation
Nuneaton Borough Corporation
Rugby Borough Corporation
Sleaford Urban District Council
Spalding Urban District Council
Uttoxeter Urban District Council
Worksop Borough Corporation

Private companies
 Boston and District Electric Supply Company (records from 1923)
 Derbyshire and Nottinghamshire Electric Power Company (records from 1901)
 Leicestershire and Warwickshire Electric Power Company (records from 1904)
 Melton Mowbray Electric Light Company (records from 1899)
 Midland Electric Light and Power Company Limited (formed c.1881)
 Mid Lincolnshire Electric Supply Company Limited (records from 1936)
 Northampton Electric Light & Power Co Ltd (records from 1936)
 Oakham Gas and Electricity Company Limited (records from 1917)
 Rushden and District Electric Supply Company Limited (records from 1945)
 Tamworth District Electric Supply Company (records from 1930)
 Urban Electric Supply Company
 Wellingborough Electric Supply Company Limited (records from 1900)
 W.J. Furse and Company Limited (records from 1912)

Companies merged into Eastern Electricity Board (EEB) 

The board's area was defined as: Cambridgeshire, Hertfordshire, Huntingdonshire, the Isle of Ely, Norfolk, Suffolk and parts of Bedfordshire, Buckinghamshire, Essex, Middlesex, Oxfordshire and the Soke of Peterborough.

Local authority undertakings
Aylesbury Borough Corporation
Bedford Borough Corporation
Clacton Urban District Council
Colchester Borough Corporation
East Dereham Urban District Council
Felixstowe Urban District Council
Finchley Borough Corporation
Great Yarmouth County Borough Corporation
Harwich Borough Corporation
Hertford Borough Corporation
Hitchin Urban District Council
Hornsey Borough Corporation
Ipswich County Borough Corporation
King's Lynn Borough Corporation
Lowestoft Borough Corporation
Luton Borough Corporation
Norwich County Borough Corporation (founded 1893 as Norwich Electricity Company; transferred to Electricity Committee of Norwich Corporation in 1902)
Peterborough City Corporation
Southend-on-Sea County Borough Corporation
Thurrock Urban District Council
Watford Borough Corporation

Private companies

 Aldeburgh Electric Supply Company
 Bedfordshire, Cambridgeshire and Huntingdonshire Electricity Company
 Brentwood District Electric Company
 Bungay Gas and Electricity Co Ltd (formed 1926)
 Cambridge Electric Supply Company
 Chesham Electric Light and Power Company
 Colne Valley Electric Supply Company
 East Anglian Electric Supply Company (incorporating Bury St Edmunds Corporation)
 East Suffolk Electricity Distribution Company
 Frinton-on-Sea & District Electric Light and Power Company
 Letchworth Electricity Limited
 Newmarket Electric Light Company
 North Metropolitan Electric Power Supply Company ("Northmet") – based in Wood Green, N22
 Northwood Electric Light and Power Company
 Welwyn Garden City Electricity Supply Company
 Wickford and District Electricity Supply Company
 Wisbech Electric Light and Power Company

Companies merged into London Electricity Board (LEB) 

The board's area was defined as: The administrative County of London and parts of Essex, Kent, Middlesex and Surrey.

Local authority undertakings
Barking Borough Corporation
Barnes Borough Corporation
Battersea Borough Council
Beckenham Borough Corporation
Bermondsey Borough Council
Bethnal Green Borough Council
Bexley Borough Corporation
Bromley Borough Corporation
Dartford Borough Corporation
East Ham County Borough Corporation
Erith Borough Corporation
Fulham Borough Council
Hackney Borough Council
Hammersmith Borough Council
Hampstead Borough Council (1894)
Ilford Borough Corporation
Islington Borough Council
Leyton Borough Corporation
Poplar Borough Council
St Marylebone Borough Council
St Pancras Borough Council
Shoreditch Borough Council
Southwark Borough Council
Stepney Borough Council
Stoke Newington Borough Council
Walthamstow Borough Corporation
West Ham County Borough Corporation (West Ham Electricity Board)
Willesden Borough Corporation
Wimbledon Borough Corporation
Woolwich Borough Council

Joint electricity authority 
Created under the provisions of the Electricity (Supply) Act 1919
 London and Home Counties Joint Electricity Authority – established in 1925. Upon nationalisation its assets were split between the South Eastern Electricity Board, the Eastern Electricity Board and the London Electricity Board.

Private companies
 Brompton and Kensington Electricity Supply Company – formed January 1889 as the House to House Electric Supply Company, changed its name August 1890, generating station at Richmond Road Brompton, part of the London Power Company 
 Central Electric Supply Company, part of the London Power Company, wound up on 25 October 1932
Central London Electricity Limited (formerly Charing Cross Company)
Charing Cross Electricity Supply Company – originated from a company called the Electric Supply Corporation Limited formed in 1889 with a capital of £100,000, this changed its name to the Charing Cross and Strand Electricity Supply Corporation, generating stations at Maiden Lane, Commercial Road Lambeth, Bow station, part of the London Power Company
 Chelsea Electricity Supply Company – formed 1886; generating station at Draycott Place / Cadogan Gardens and Flood Street; took over the Cadogan Electric Lighting Company (formed in March 1887 with a capital of £30,000, generating station at Manor Street near the Albert Bridge, went into liquidation in February 1891), Cadogan Company taken over by the New Cadogan and Belgravia Electric Supply Company (registered 30 June 1890), the latter company changed its name to St Luke's Chelsea Electric Lighting Company on 6 July 1892, in December 1892 the St Luke's Company purchased the assets of the Cadogan Company for £4,250 in cash and £4,500 in shares, assets transferred to the Chelsea Electric Supply Company for £10,250 on 5 April 1893, part of the London Power Company, taken over by Charing Cross Co 1937
 Chislehurst Electric Supply Company
 City of London Electric Lighting Company – formed July 1891 from the Pioneer company, generating stations at Bankside and Wool Quay Member of the No. 1 group of undertakings.
 County of London Electric Supply Company – formed June 1891 with a capital of £100,000, generating stations at City Road Basin Regent's Canal, and Wandsworth; renamed the County of London and Brush Provincial Electric Lighting Company in 1894 Member of the No. 1 group of undertakings.
 Foots Cray Electricity Supply Company
 Hampstead Electric Supply Company Ltd (records from 1898)
 Kensington and Knightsbridge Electric Lighting Company – formed March 1888 with a capital of £250,000, took over the Kensington Court Electric Light Company (itself formed 1886 with capital of £10,000), generating stations at High Street Kensington and Cheval Place, Wood Lane Shepherds Bush (joint enterprise with Notting Hill Electric Lighting Company), part of the London Power Company
 London Associated Electricity Undertakings Limited formed in 1935 to acquire, combine and coordinate the electricity distribution interests of six west London electricity companies. 
London Electric Supply Corporation (LESCo) – formed in 1887 out of Grosvenor Gallery Electric Supply Corporation, London's first commercial electric power supplier, part of the London Power Company
 London Power Company
 Metropolitan Electric Supply Company – formed as South Metropolitan Electric Supply Company in November 1887 with capital of £250,000, 'South' dropped from title in July 1888, generating stations at Whitehall Court, Rathbone Place, Sardinia Street, Manchester Square, Amberley Road, Acton Lane Willesden, part of the London Power Company January 1927
 Notting Hill Electric Lighting Company – formed February 1888 with a capital of £100,000, generating station at Bulmer Place and Wood Lane Shepherds Bush (joint venture with Kensington and Knightsbridge Electric Lighting Company), part of the London Power Company
 St James' and Pall Mall Electric Lighting Company – formed March 1888, began supplies April 1889 from a generating station in Mason's Yard Duke Street, this later converted to a sub-station for bulk supplies from Grove Road, part of the London Power Company
 South London Electric Supply Corporation – formed in December 1896 with a capital of £325,000, to supply the Borough of Lambeth. A generating station was built at Loughborough Junction, decommissioned in 1929 after which the Corporation took bulk supplies from other members of the No.1 group.
 South Metropolitan Electric Light and Power Company – established in 1904 upon the amalgamation of the Crystal Palace District Electric Supply Company and the Blackheath and Greenwich District Electric Light Company. Built Blackwall Point power station. Member of the No. 1 group of undertakings. 
 Westminster Electric Supply Corporation – formed June 1888 with a capital of £100,000, generating stations at Dacre Street Victoria, St John's Wharf Millbank, Eccleston Place and Davies Street, took over supply of Westminster Electrical Syndicate, part of the London Power Company

Companies merged into Merseyside & North Wales Electricity Board (MANWEB) 

The board's area was defined as: Anglesey, Caernarvonshire, Denbighshire, Flintshire, Merionethshire, Montgomeryshire and parts of Cardiganshire, Cheshire, Lancashire (including Liverpool) and Shropshire.

Local authority undertakings
Aberystwyth Borough Corporation
Bangor City Corporation
Bethesda Urban District Council
Birkenhead County Borough Corporation
Caernarvon Borough Corporation
Chester County Borough Corporation
Colwyn Bay Borough Corporation
Congleton Borough Corporation
Connah's Quay Urban District Council
Conway Borough Corporation
Crewe Borough Corporation
Dolgelly Urban District Council
Formby Urban District Council
Hawarden Rural District Council
Holyhead Urban District Council
Hoylake Urban District Council
Liverpool County Borough Corporation
Llandudno Urban District Council
Llanfairfechan Urban District Council
Llangollen Urban District Council
Menai Bridge Urban District Council
Mold Urban District Council
Oswestry Borough Corporation
Penmaenmawr Urban District Council
Prestatyn Urban District Council
Rhyl Urban District Council
Ruthin Borough Corporation
St Helens County Borough Corporation
Southport County Borough Corporation
Wallasey County Borough Corporation
Warrington County Borough Corporation
Wrexham Borough Corporation

Joint electricity authority
Created under the provisions of the Electricity (Supply) Act 1919
North Wales & South Cheshire Joint Electricity Authority (records from 1923).

Private companies
Borth and Ynyslas Electric Supply Company
Electricity Distribution of North Wales and District Limited
Machynlleth Electric Supply Company
Mersey Power Company
Mid-Cheshire Electricity Supply Company
North Wales Power Company
Towyn, Aberdovey and District Electricity Company
Yale Electric Power Company

Companies merged into Midlands Electricity Board (MEB) 

The board's area was defined as: Herefordshire, Worcestershire and parts of Gloucestershire, Oxfordshire, Shropshire, Staffordshire and Warwickshire (including Birmingham).

Local authority undertakings
Birmingham County Borough Corporation
Cannock Urban District Council
Cheltenham Borough Corporation
Gloucester County Borough Corporation
Leek Urban District Council
Lichfield City Corporation
Malvern Urban District Council
Newcastle-under-Lyme Borough Corporation
Stafford Borough Corporation
Stoke-on-Trent County Borough Corporation
Stone Urban District Council
Sutton Coldfield Borough Corporation
Walsall County Borough Corporation
Warmley Rural District Council
West Bromwich County Borough Corporation
Wolverhampton County Borough Corporation
Worcester County Borough Corporation

Joint electricity authorities
Created under the provisions of the Electricity (Supply) Act 1919
North West Midlands Joint Electricity Authority – created 1928.
West Midlands Joint Electricity Authority – created 1925.

Private companies
Chasetown and District Electricity Company
Market Drayton Electric Light and Power Company
Midland Electric Corporation for Power Distribution Limited
Shropshire, Worcestershire and Staffordshire Electric Power Company
Stroud Electric Supply Company
Thornbury and District Electricity Company
West Gloucestershire Power Company

Companies merged into North Eastern Electricity Board (NEEB)

The board's area was defined as: Durham, Northumberland, the North Riding of Yorkshire and parts of the East and West Ridings of Yorkshire (including York).

Local authority undertakings
Amble Urban District Council
Crook and Willington Urban District Council
Darlington County Borough Corporation
Eston Urban District Council
Guisborough Urban District Council
Harrogate Borough Corporation
Middlesbrough County Borough Corporation
Redcar Borough Corporation
Richmond (Yorks) Borough Corporation
Scarborough Borough Corporation
Seaham Urban District Council
Skelton and Brotton Urban District Council
South Shields County Borough Corporation
Stanley Urban District Council
Stockton-on-Tees Borough Corporation
Sunderland County Borough Corporation
Tynemouth County Borough Corporation
West Hartlepool Borough Corporation
Whitby Urban District Council
York County Borough Corporation

Private companies

 Askrigg and Reeth Electric Supply Company
 Cleveland and Durham Electric Power Company
 County of Durham Electrical Power Distribution Company
 County of Durham Power Supply Company
 Durham Collieries Electric Power Company
 Durham County Electric Power Company
 Hawes Electric Lighting Company
 Hexham and District Supply Company
 Houghton le Spring and District Electric Lighting Company
 Northern Counties Electricity Supply Company
 Tees Power Station Company
 Newcastle and District Electric Lighting Company
 North Eastern Electric Supply Company Limited (NESCo; formed in 1889 as Newcastle-upon-Tyne Electric Supply Company Ltd.) – built a large AC network pioneered by engineer Charles Merz

Companies merged into North Western Electricity Board (NORWEB)

The board's area was defined as: Cumberland, Westmorland and parts of Cheshire, Derbyshire, Lancashire (including Manchester) and of the West Riding of Yorkshire.

Local authority undertakings
Accrington Borough Corporation
Alderley Edge and Wilmslow Electricity Board
Ashton-in-Makerfield Urban District Council
Ashton-under-Lyne Borough Corporation
Atherton Urban District Council
Bacup Borough Corporation
Barrow-in-Furness County Borough Corporation (1899)
Blackburn County Borough Corporation
Blackpool County Borough Corporation
Bolton County Borough Corporation
Bredbury and Romiley Urban District Council
Brierfield Urban District Council
Burnley County Borough Corporation
Bury County Borough Corporation
Buxton Borough Corporation
Carlisle County Borough Corporation (1899)
Cheadle and Gatley Urban District Council
Clitheroe Borough Corporation
Colne Borough Corporation
Darwen Borough Corporation
Eccles Borough Corporation
Farnworth Borough Corporation
Fleetwood Borough Corporation
Grange Urban District Council (1912)
Haslingden Borough Corporation
Hazel Grove and Bramhall Urban District Council
Heywood Borough Corporation
Hindley Urban District Council
Horwich Urban District Council
Kendal Borough Corporation (1902)
Lancaster City Corporation
Leigh Borough Corporation
Littleborough Urban District Council
Lytham St Anne's Borough Corporation
Macclesfield Borough Corporation
Manchester Corporation Electricity Department
Marple Urban District Council
Middleton Borough Corporation
Millom Rural District Council – Millom Urban District Council (1927) absorbed by RDC in 1934
Milnrow Urban District Council
Morecambe and Heysham Borough Corporation
Nelson Borough Corporation
New Mills Urban District Council
Newton-le-Willows Urban District Council
Oldham County Borough Corporation
Padiham Urban District Council
Preston County Borough Corporation
Radcliffe Borough Corporation
Rawtenstall Borough Corporation
Rochdale County Borough Corporation
Sale Borough Corporation
Salford County Borough Corporation
Stalybridge, Hyde, Mossley & Dukinfield Transport & Electricity Board
Stockport County Borough Corporation
Stretford and District Electricity Board
Swinton and Pendlebury Borough Corporation
Thornton Cleveleys Urban District Council
Turton Urban District Council
Ulverston Urban District Council (1926)
Whitehaven Borough Corporation (1893)
Whitworth Urban District Council
Wigan County Borough Corporation
Workington Borough Corporation (1925)

Private companies
Altrincham Electric Supply Limited
Cark and District Electricity Company (1918)
Keswick Electric Light Company (1890)
Lancashire Electric Power Company
Mid-Cumberland Electricity Company (1932)
Ormskirk Electric Supply Company
Penrith Electricity Supply Company (1909)
Sedbergh Electricity Supply Company (originally J.J. Martin & Co.) (1922)
Settle and District Electricity Company
South Cumberland Electricity Supply Company (originally Cumberland Waste Heat Owners Co. Ltd) (1924)
Trent Valley and High Peak Electricity Company
Westmorland and District Electricity Supply Company (1933)
Windermere and District Electricity Supply Company (originally R.H. Fell & Son Ltd.) (1893)

Companies merged into South East Scotland Electricity Board

The board's area was defined as: Berwickshire, Clackmannanshire, Fife, Lothians (East Lothian, Midlothian, West Lothian), Peebles, Selkirkshire,  and parts of Dunbartonshire, Roxburghshire and Stirlingshire.

Local authority undertakings
Borrowstounness Burgh Corporation
Denny and Dunipace Burgh Corporation
Edinburgh Corporation (County of the City of Edinburgh)
Falkirk Burgh Corporation
Kirkcaldy Burgh Corporation
North Berwick Burgh Corporation
Stirling Burgh Corporation
West Lothian County Council

Private companies
Fife Electric Power Company
Lothians Electric Power Company
Musselburgh and District Electric Light and Traction Company
Scottish Central Electric Power Company
Scottish Midlands Electricity Supply Limited
 Scottish Power Company Limited
Scottish Southern Electric Supply Company

Companies merged into South Eastern Electricity Board (SEEBOARD) 

The board's area was defined as: Parts of Kent, Middlesex, Surrey and Sussex.

Local authority undertakings
Ashford Urban District Council
Bexhill Borough Corporation
Brighton County Borough Corporation
Canterbury County Borough Corporation
Croydon County Borough Corporation
Dover Borough Corporation
Eastbourne County Borough Corporation
East Grinstead Urban District Council
Epsom and Ewell Borough Corporation
Faversham Borough Corporation
Gillingham Borough Corporation
Gravesend Borough Corporation
Guildford Borough Corporation
Hastings County Borough Corporation
Horsham Urban District Council
Hove Borough Corporation
Kingston upon Thames Borough Corporation
Maidstone Borough Corporation
Margate, Broadstairs and District Electricity Board
Reigate Borough Corporation
Tonbridge Urban District Council
Tunbridge Wells Borough Corporation
Walton and Weybridge Urban District Council
Worthing Borough Corporation

Joint electricity authority
Created under the provisions of the Electricity (Supply) Act 1919
 London and Home Counties Joint Electricity Authority

Private companies
Burgess Hill Electricity Limited
Central Sussex Electricity Limited
Folkestone Electricity Supply Company
Guildford Gas Light and Coke Company
Herne Bay and District Electricity Supply Company
Horley and District Electricity Supply Company
Kent Electric Power Company
Lewes and District Electric Supply Company
Peacehaven Electric Light and Power Company
Ramsgate and District Electric Supply Company
Richmond (Surrey) Electric Light and Power Company
Ringmer and District Electricity Company
Seaford and Newhaven Electricity Limited
Sevenoaks and District Electricity Company
Sheerness and District Electric Supply Company
Shoreham and District Electric Lighting and Power Company
South-East Kent Electric Power Company
Steyning Electricity Limited
Sussex Electricity Supply Company
Uckfield Gas and Electricity Company
Weald Electricity Supply Company
West Kent Electric Company
Whistable Electric Company
Woking Electric Supply Company

Companies merged into South Wales Electricity Board (SWALEB) 

The board's area was defined as: Brecknockshire, Carmarthenshire, Glamorganshire, Monmouthshire, Pembrokeshire, Radnorshire and part of Cardiganshire.

Local authority undertakings
Aberdare Urban District Council
Abertillery Urban District Council
Ammanford Urban District Council
Barry Borough Corporation
Bedwas and Machen Urban District Council
Bedwellty Urban District Council
Bridgend Urban District Council
Caerphilly Urban District Council
Cardiff County Borough Corporation
Cardiff Rural District Council
Cwmbran Urban District Council
Ebbw Vale Urban District Council
Gellygaer Urban District Council
Llandrindod Wells Urban District Council
Maesteg Urban District Council
Milford Haven Urban District Council
Mountain Ash Urban District Council
Mynyddislwyn Urban District Council
Neath Borough Corporation
Neath Rural District Council
Newport County Borough Corporation (Mon.)
Ogmore and Garw Urban District Council
Penarth Urban District Council
Penybont Rural District Council
Pontardawe Rural District Council
Pontypridd Urban District Council
Port Talbot Borough Corporation
Rhondda Urban District Council
Risca Urban District Council
Swansea County Borough Corporation
Tredegar Urban District Council

Private companies
Aberayron and District Electricity Supply and Power Company
Carmarthen Electric Supply Company
Chepstow Electric Lighting and Power Company
Gorseinon Electric Light Company
Llanelly and District Electric Supply Company
Merthyr Electric Traction and Lighting Company
Monmouth Electricity Company
Pontypool Electric Light and Power Company
Porthcawl Electricity Company
South Wales Electric Power Company
South Wales Power Station Company Limited
West Cambrian Power Company

 Companies merged into South West Scotland Electricity Board The board's area was defined as: Ayrshire, Dumfries-shire, Glasgow, Kirkcudbrightshire, Lanarkshire, Renfrewshire, Wigtownshire and parts of Dunbartonshire, Roxburghshire and Stirlingshire.Local authority undertakings
Airdrie Burgh Corporation
Ayrshire Electricity Board
Coatbridge Burgh Corporation
Dumbarton Burgh  Corporation (assets owned by Electric Supply Corporation Limited)
Dumfries Burgh Corporation
Dumfriesshire County Council
Dunbartonshire County Council
Glasgow Corporation (County of the City of Glasgow)
Greenock Burgh Corporation
Hamilton Burgh Corporation
Helensburgh Burgh Corporation
Kirkcudbright County Council
Lanarkshire County Council
Motherwell and Wishaw Burgh Corporation
Paisley Burgh Corporation

Private companies
Clyde Valley Electrical Power Company
Electric Supply Corporation Limited
Galloway Water Power Company
Lanarkshire Hydro Electric Power Company
Skelmorlie Electric Supply Company
Strathclyde Electricity Supply Company
Wigtownshire Electricity Company

 Companies merged into South Western Electricity Board (SWEB) The board's area was defined as: Cornwall (including the Isles of Scilly), Devonshire and parts of Dorsetshire, Gloucestershire (including Bristol) and Somersetshire.Local authority undertakings
Barnstaple Borough Corporation
Bath County Borough Corporation
Bridport Borough Corporation
Bristol County Borough Corporation
Exeter County Borough Corporation
Lyme Regis Borough Corporation
Plymouth County Borough Corporation
Plympton St Mary Rural District Council
Taunton Borough Corporation
Tiverton Borough Corporation
Torquay Borough Corporation

Private companies
Bideford and District Electricity Supply Company
Bridgwater and District Electric Supply & Traction Company
Brixham Gas and Electricity Company
Bude Electric Supply Company
Burnham and District Electric Supply Company
Chudleigh Electric Light and Power Company
Cornwall Electric Power Company
Culm Valley Electric Supply Company
Dawlish Electric Light and Power Company
East Devon Electricity Company
Exe Valley Electricity Company
Holsworthy Electric Supply Company
Ilfracombe Electric Light and Power Company
Lynton and Lynmouth Electric Light Company
Mid-Somerset Electric Supply Company
Minehead Electric Supply Company
North Somerset Electric Supply Company
Paignton Electric Light and Power Company
St Austell and District Electric Lighting and Power Company
Salcombe Gas and Electricity Company
Seaton and District Electric Light Company
South Somerset and District Electricity Company
Teignmouth Electric Lighting Company
Wellington District Electricity Company
West Devon Electric Supply Company
West of England Electric Investments Limited
Weston-super-Mare and District Electric Supply Company

 Companies merged into Southern Electricity Board (SEB) The board's area was defined as: Berkshire, Hampshire, the Isle of Wight, Wiltshire and parts of Buckinghamshire, Dorsetshire, Gloucestershire, Middlesex, Oxfordshire, Somersetshire, Surrey and Sussex.Local authority undertakings
Aldershot Borough Corporation
Basingstoke Borough Corporation
Bournemouth County Borough Corporation
Brentford and Chiswick Borough Corporation
Calne Borough Corporation
Chichester City Corporation
Dorchester Borough Corporation
Ealing Borough Corporation
Fareham Urban District Council
Heston and Isleworth Borough Corporation
High Wycombe Borough Corporation
Maidenhead Borough Corporation
Marlborough Borough Corporation
Oxford County Borough Corporation
Portland Urban District Council
Portsmouth County Borough Corporation
Reading County Borough Corporation
Southampton County Borough Corporation
Swindon Borough Corporation
Weymouth and Melcombe Regis Borough Corporation
Winchester City Corporation
Witney Urban District Council

Private companies
Alton District Electricity Company
Ascot District Gas and Electricity Company
Blandford Forum and District Electric Supply Company
Bognor and District Gas & Electricity Company
Bournemouth and Poole Electricity Supply Company
Brentford Electric Supply Company
Burford Electric Light and Power Company
Egham and Staines Electricity Company
Farnham Gas and Electricity Company
Isle of Wight Electric Light and Power Company
Metropolitan Electric Supply Company
Mid Southern Utility Company
Milford-on-Sea Electric Supply Company
Milton and Barton-on-Sea (Hants) Electricity Supply Company
Petersfield Electric Light and Power Company
Ringwood Electric Supply Company
Salisbury Electric Light and Supply Company
Slough & Datchet Electric Supply Company
Uxbridge & District Electric Supply Company
Wessex Electricity Company
West Hampshire Electricity Company
Whitchurch (Hants) Gas and Electricity Company
Wilton Electricity Supply Company
Windsor Electrical Installation Company
Woodstock and District Electrical Distribution Company
Yorktown (Camberley) and District Gas and Electricity Company

 Companies merged into Yorkshire Electricity Board (YEB) The board's area was defined as: Parts of Derbyshire, Lincolnshire, Nottinghamshire and of the East and West Ridings of Yorkshire.Local authority undertakings
Adwick-le-Street Urban District Council
Barnoldswick Urban District Council
Barnsley County Borough Corporation
Batley Borough Corporation
Bingley Urban District Council
Bradford County Borough Corporation
Bridlington Borough Corporation
Brighouse Borough Corporation
Castleford Urban District Council
Cleethorpes Borough Corporation
Colne Valley Urban District Council
Dearne District Electricity Board
Dewsbury County Borough Corporation
Doncaster County Borough Corporation
Earby Urban District Council
Elland Urban District Council
Gainsborough Urban District Council
Grimsby County Borough Corporation
Halifax County Borough Corporation
Hebden Royd Urban District Council
Heckmondwike Urban District Council
Holmfirth Urban District Council
Huddersfield County Borough Corporation
Ilkley Urban District Council
Keighley Borough Corporation
Kingston-upon-Hull County Borough Corporation
Leeds County Borough Corporation
Louth Borough Corporation
Mexborough Urban District Council
Mirfield Urban District Council
Morley - Borough Corporation
Normanton Urban District Council
Ossett Borough Corporation
Pudsey Borough Corporation
Rotherham County Borough Corporation
Scunthorpe Borough Corporation
Sheffield County Borough Corporation
Shipley Urban District Council
Skipton Urban District Council
Spenborough Urban District Council
Todmorden Borough Corporation
Wakefield County Borough Corporation

Private companies
Buckrose Light and Power Company
Craven Hydro-Electric Supply Company
Electrical Distribution of Yorkshire Limited
North Lincolnshire and Howdenshire Electricity Company
Pontefract Electricity Company
South East Yorkshire Light and Power Company
Tadcaster Electricity Company
Yorkshire Electric Power Company

Other companies

The following companies had interests in multiple locations.

 British Power & Light Corporation(1929) Limited – founded 1929 acquired a controlling interest in undertakings in North Wales; East Suffolk; South Somerset; Trent Valley; West Hampshire; and Ringwood
Christy Bros. and Company Limited – founded 1883 as electrical contractors, applied for or acquired electricity undertakings: Crediton,  Holsworthy, Aldeburgh, Pateley Bridge, Portishead, Mid-Somerset, North Somerset, West Devon, Street.
 Edmundsons Electricity Corporation Limited – founded in 1897 built generating stations and electricity supply systems (electricity undertakings) in Folkestone; Winchester; Salisbury; Ventnor; and Shrewsbury; and acquired further electricity company franchises 
Electrical Finance and Securities Company Limited – incorporated in June 1914 to finance and control undertakings. In 1927 had interests in Colne Valley; Northwood; Foots Cray; Lothians; and Boston 
Midland Counties Electric Supply Company Limited – originally formed in 1912 as Tramways Light and Power Company Limited, owned (in 1921) the Leicestershire and Warwickshire Electric Power Company; Midland Electric Light and Power Company Limited; Cheltenham and District Light Railway Company; Derbyshire and Nottinghamshire Electric Power Company; Leamington and Warwick Electrical Company Limited; Nottinghamshire and Derbyshire Tramways Company.

Footnotes

 See also 
 Electricity Act 1947 (10 & 11 Geo.6 c.54)

References

 External links 
"Chelsea Parish" on middlesexpast.net
EDF Energy educational page
MK Heritage
Records of the East Midlands Electricity Board, 1948-1990, Nottingham University Library
Kentford History
Resources on 19th century electricity supply, IEE Archives
British History OnlineThe Coming of Electricity to Bergh Apton'', Derek J. Blake, in Bergh Apton newsletter December 2004
"The Twentieth Century", St Edmundsbury Borough Council
West Ham's Timeline
London Area Power Supply: A Survey of London's Electric Lighting and Power Stations, M.A.C. Horne (PDF) - contains a detailed list of generating companies, not reproduced here because of copyright
Survey of Belford 1995 (with notes on electricity supply in North East)
"A-Z of industries - Electricity" on Industrial History of Cumbria
Hampstead Public Services from the Victoria County History of Middlesex
Electricity (Allocation of Undertakings to Area Boards) Order, 1948 (1948 No. 484)

Defunct electric power companies of the United Kingdom
UK former companies
Power